The Confederation of Trade Unions of the Slovak Republic (KOZ SR) is a national trade union center in Slovakia. The KOZ SR is affiliated with the International Trade Union Confederation, and the European Trade Union Confederation, as well as having observer status at the Trade Union Advisory Committee to the OECD.

History 
In March, 1990 the Czechoslovak Confederation of Trade Unions (CSKOS) was formed from the remains of the Central Council of Trade Unions (URO). Within months, as the separation of the two states developed, the party was divided into the Bohemian-Moravian Chamber (CMK CSKOS) and the KOZ SR.

During the Dzurinda-era, the KOZ became weakened. In 2006 KOZ and the left-wing SMER party agreed on cooperation, and the KOZ supported the SMER. After the SMER election victory in 2006, the KOZ once again gained strength.

Literature

External links
 KOZ SR official site

References

Trade unions in Slovakia
International Trade Union Confederation
European Trade Union Confederation
Trade Union Advisory Committee to the OECD